John McGregor Carter  (born 8 May 1950) is a New Zealand politician, and member of the National Party. He represented the Bay of Islands, Far North and Northland electorates in Parliament from 1987 until July 2011, when he became New Zealand's High Commissioner to the Cook Islands. Since the October 2013 local elections, he was mayor of the Far North District for 9 years until his retirement from politics in 2022.

Early life

He was born in Te Kōpuru, Northland and educated at Otamatea High School. Before entering politics, Carter worked as a local government administration official. He was the county clerk and principal officer at Hokianga County Council until his election to Parliament in 1987. Carter is married, and has one daughter and two sons.

Political career

Member of Parliament 

Carter was elected to Parliament in the 1987 election, winning the Bay of Islands electorate. He continued to represent the area when the seat changed names to Far North in 1993 and later Northland. The National Party came to power in the 1990 election and Carter was appointed as the Junior Government Whip, and later Senior Government Whip until 1995 and again from 1996 to mid-2004.

Carter was sacked as whip in 1995, after he phoned into a talkback radio show, hosted by fellow National MP John Banks, impersonating a work-shy Māori called Hone, causing widespread offence.

In the first term of the Fifth National Government, Carter was a Minister outside of Cabinet, holding the Civil Defence, Senior Citizens, Racing and Associate Local Government portfolios. He also chaired the Auckland Governance Legislation select committee.

In February 2011, the government announced that Carter would be the next High Commissioner to the Cook Islands. He left Parliament in July 2011, but his departure did not result in a by-election, as the vacancy occurred within six months of the next general election. On 13 June 2011 Carter was granted the right to retain the title of The Honourable for his lifetime. He retired as New Zealand's High Commissioner to the Cook Islands in July 2013.

Local government 
Carter returned to the Far North District of New Zealand, successfully running for Mayor of the District at the 2013 local elections, defeating the incumbent Wayne Brown. He was re-elected again in both 2016 and 2019. He lives at Waipapakauri Ramp on Ninety Mile Beach.

In October 2021, Carter expressed opposition to the Sixth Labour Government's Three Waters reform programme, describing it as a "mistake."

Political views

Carter is a supporter of the monarchy in New Zealand. In 1992, a year described by Queen Elizabeth II as her annus horribilis, Carter called on New Zealanders to write in to express their support for her, having written to The Times of London criticising the British media's apparent lack of respect towards the Queen. Inundated with letters of support, he remarked that "we wanted her to know we cared". In March 1994 he publicly disavowed Prime Minister Jim Bolger's call for a New Zealand republic.

Honours
In 1990, Carter was awarded the New Zealand 1990 Commemoration Medal. In the 2012 New Year Honours, he was appointed a Companion of the Queen's Service Order for services as a Member of Parliament.

References

External links
John Carter official site
Profile at National party

|-

|-

|-

|-

|-

1950 births
Living people
New Zealand National Party MPs
Companions of the Queen's Service Order
Members of the New Zealand House of Representatives
New Zealand monarchists
People from Te Kōpuru
New Zealand MPs for North Island electorates
High Commissioners of New Zealand to the Cook Islands
Mayors of places in the Northland Region
21st-century New Zealand politicians